Union Township is one of eight townships in Fulton County, Indiana. As of the 2010 census, its population was 1,397 and it contained 727 housing units.

Geography

Cities and towns
 Kewanna

Unincorporated towns
 Bruce Lake Station
 Guise Park
 Lake Bruce
(This list is based on USGS data and may include former settlements.)

Adjacent townships
 Aubbeenaubbee Township (north)
 Rochester Township (east)
 Wayne Township (south)
 Van Buren Township, Pulaski County (southwest)
 Harrison Township, Pulaski County (west)
 Tippecanoe Township, Pulaski County (northwest)

Major highways
  Indiana State Road 14
  Indiana State Road 17

Cemeteries
The township contains four cemeteries: Barnett, Bruce Lake, Independent Order of Odd Fellows and Shaffer.

References
 United States Census Bureau cartographic boundary files
 U.S. Board on Geographic Names

External links

Townships in Fulton County, Indiana
Townships in Indiana